George Elliott, M.Div. (b 1949)  is a retired Canadian Suffragan Bishop: he was in charge of the York-Simcoe area of the Diocese of Toronto from 2001 until 2013.

References 

Anglican bishops of Toronto
21st-century Anglican Church of Canada bishops
1949 births
Living people
University of Toronto alumni